Hans Egon Reinert (24 September 1908 - 23 April 1959) was a German politician (CDU) who served as Minister-President of Saarland from 1957 until his death due to a car accident in 1959.

References 

1908 births
1959 deaths
Road incident deaths in Germany
People from Saarbrücken
Goethe University Frankfurt alumni
Ministers-President of Saarland
20th-century German politicians
University of Bonn alumni
Heidelberg University alumni
Christian Democratic Union of Germany politicians